Jacob Benton (August 19, 1814 – September 29, 1892) was an American politician, and a United States representative from New Hampshire.

Early life
Born in Waterford, Vermont, Benton attended the common schools, Lyndon Academy, and Randolph Academy. He graduated from Burr and Burton Seminary at Manchester, Vermont, in 1839.

In 1841, Benton began to study law with Heaton and Reed in Montpelier, Vermont. He became principal of the academy at Concord Corner, Vermont, while continuing to study law with Henry A. Bellows of Littleton, New Hampshire. He moved to Lancaster, New Hampshire, in 1843, was admitted to the bar, and commenced practice in partnership with Ira Young.

Career
Benton was a member of the New Hampshire House of Representatives 1854–1856. He also served as a delegate to the Republican National Convention in 1860.

Elected as a Republican to the Fortieth and Forty-first Congresses, Benton served as United States Representative for the third district of New Hampshire (March 4, 1867 – March 3, 1871) and declined to be a candidate for renomination in 1870. After leaving Congress, he resumed the practice of law.

Death
Thrown from his carriage, Benton died in Lancaster, New Hampshire, on September 29, 1892 (age 78 years, 41 days). He is interred at Summer Street Cemetery, Lancaster, New Hampshire.

Family life

Benton was the son of Samuel S. and Esther Prouty Benton and married Louisa Dwight in 1860.

References

External links
 Retrieved on 2008-08-13

1814 births
1892 deaths
People from Caledonia County, Vermont
Republican Party members of the United States House of Representatives from New Hampshire
Republican Party members of the New Hampshire House of Representatives
19th-century American politicians